Jerry Anderson (23 February 1932 – 19 February 2009) was a Puerto Rican diver. He competed at the 1964 Summer Olympics and the 1968 Summer Olympics.

References

1932 births
2009 deaths
Puerto Rican male divers
Olympic divers of Puerto Rico
Divers at the 1964 Summer Olympics
Divers at the 1968 Summer Olympics
People from Hastings, Nebraska
20th-century Puerto Rican people